HMS Abastor was a Royal Navy training establishment involved in the planning of PLUTO, the undersea pipeline that supplied the allied troops with fuel during the liberation of Europe in 1944. It was situated at Tilbury, Essex. There was another PLUTO training establishment under the name HMS Abatos at Woolston, Southampton.

Abastor's nominal depot ship was the NAB Interlude (43627), a Naval Auxiliary Boat which took the form of a petrol-driven harbour launch. It was in service as a depot ship from November 1, 1943 through til July 1945, which was when it was transferred back to being a harbour launch.

References

Royal Navy shore establishments
Royal Navy bases in England
Military installations established in 1943
Military installations closed in 1945
History of Thurrock
Military history of Essex